Not Fragile is the third studio album by Canadian rock band Bachman–Turner Overdrive (BTO), released in 1974. It proved to be the group's most popular album (not counting compilations), and is the only BTO album to have reached No. 1 on the US Billboard 200.

Description
In a 1995 interview, Randy Bachman indicated that he thought that using the word "fragile" as a title for a rock album, as Yes had done with their 1971 album Fragile, was "strange." He thought that BTO music could be "dropped and kicked" without breaking, so, without intending any commentary about Yes, the band "tongue-in-cheek" called their next album Not Fragile.

The album marks the debut of guitarist Blair Thornton, who, unlike his predecessor Tim Bachman, is billed on the album liner notes as "second lead guitar". Thornton's dual-guitar solos with Randy Bachman are prominent features on many Not Fragile tracks. "Roll On Down the Highway" and "You Ain't Seen Nothing Yet" were hit singles, with the latter hitting #1 on the Canadian and US singles charts in November 1974, receiving GOLD certification by the RIAA. Other cuts had significant airplay on FM rock radio. The album produced the only BTO singles to chart in the United Kingdom. "You Ain't Seen Nothing Yet" hit #2 on the UK charts in November 1974, and "Roll On Down the Highway" hit the #22 position in January 1975.

"You Ain't Seen Nothing Yet" was a leftover track that was not originally intended to be included on Not Fragile. It was only after Charlie Fach of Mercury Records heard the other eight tracks, and did not see hit single potential in any of them, that he asked if the band had anything else he could hear. They played him the leftover track and he assured them it was more radio-friendly than any of the others, convincing the band to add it to the album.

Not Fragile has gone on to achieve triple platinum status. Randy Bachman has called it the band's "crowning achievement," stating: "Not Fragile was when it all came together for us. We captured the album-oriented rock audience as well as the singles audience with that album. Not Fragile made BTO recognized around the world."

Track listing

The original album cover listed "Free Wheelin'" as "Dedicated to Duane" (Duane Allman). Mercury "Musicassettes" (MCR4-1-1004) of Not Fragile were initially manufactured with "Free Wheelin'" divided into two tracks: "Free Wheelin' (Beg.)" on Program 1, and "Free Wheelin' (Concl.)" starting off Program 2.  Although the track is split over the two programs (making each program equal in time at 18:19 each), the album's running order remains intact.  This is a programming character usually used for 8-track tapes and rarely for cassettes.

Personnel
Bachman–Turner Overdrive
Randy Bachman – vocals, guitars
Blair Thornton – guitars, backing vocals
C.F. Turner – vocals, bass guitar
Robbie Bachman – drums, percussion

Guest musician
Frank Trowbridge – slide guitar on "Blue Moanin'"

Production
Producer: Randy Bachman
Engineer: Mark Smith
Assistant engineer: Buzz Richmond
Mixing assistant: Richard Dashut
Mastering: Tom "Curly" Ruff
Recording studio: Kaye-Smith Studios, Seattle, WA
 Mixed at: Sound City Studios, Los Angeles, CA
 Equipment: John Austin and Weasel (Greg) Morgan
 Design: Joe Kotleba
Art direction: Jim Ladwig
Photography: John Brott, Tom Zamiar

Charts

Weekly charts

Year-end charts

Singles

Certifications and sales

References

Bachman–Turner Overdrive albums
1974 albums
Mercury Records albums
Juno Award for Album of the Year albums